Noviherbaspirillum psychrotolerans is a Gram-negative, psychrotolerant, facultatively anaerobic and curved-rod-shaped bacterium from the genus of Noviherbaspirillum which has been isolated from soil of a glacier forefield from the Larsemann Hills from the Antarctica.

References

 

Burkholderiales
Bacteria described in 2013